Herbeumont is a municipality of Wallonia located in the province of Luxembourg, Belgium. 

On 1 January 2007 the municipality, which covers 58.81 km², had 1,536 inhabitants, giving a population density of 26.1 inhabitants per km².

The municipality consists of the following districts: Herbeumont, Saint-Médard, and Straimont. Other population centers include: Gribomont, Martilly, and Menugoutte.

Escape Dutroux 
In April 1998 Marc Dutroux escaped from his guards while being transferred to court without handcuffs by overpowering one of his guards and taking his pistol, but was captured later in Herbeumont by a ranger in the nearby woods. This resulted in the resignation of minister of interior Johan Vande Lanotte, minister of justice Stefaan De Clerck and the former police chief.

Notable residents
  (1823–1900), adventurer and participant in the California Gold Rush, born in Herbeumont

See also
 List of protected heritage sites in Herbeumont

References

External links
 

 
Municipalities of Luxembourg (Belgium)